Joseph Jehle was a Swiss sports shooter. He competed at the 1920 Summer Olympics winning two bronze medals.

References

External links
 

Year of birth missing
Year of death missing
Swiss male sport shooters
Olympic shooters of Switzerland
Shooters at the 1920 Summer Olympics
Place of birth missing
Olympic bronze medalists for Switzerland
Olympic medalists in shooting
Medalists at the 1920 Summer Olympics